Coleophora rupestrella is a moth of the family Coleophoridae. It is found in Canada, including Nova Scotia.

The larvae feed on the leaves of Fragaria and Potentilla species. They create a composite leaf case.

References

rupestrella
Moths of North America
Moths described in 1955